Flora, Fauna, and Merryweather are the three good fairies in Walt Disney's 1959 film Sleeping Beauty. They are characterized as Princess Aurora's fairy godmothers and guardians, who appear at baby Aurora's christening to present their gifts to her. The three were voiced by Verna Felton, Barbara Jo Allen, and Barbara Luddy, respectively.

Characteristics
Flora is the tallest fairy, dressed in a red gown (although her favorite color is pink), a red hat, and a red cape clipped with a yellow square. She is the leader of the group. Her gift to Aurora is the gift of beauty. She created and possesses the powerful Sword of Truth and the invulnerable Shield of Virtue, which she can conjure whenever she sees fit. She is voiced by Verna Felton.

Fauna is the middle fairy, dressed in a green gown, a green hat, and a green cape clipped with a green triangle. She is shown to be a bit flighty, but is the kindest of the three and the most sensitive. Her gift to Aurora is the gift of song. She is voiced by Barbara Jo Allen.

Merryweather is the shortest fairy, dressed in a blue gown, a blue hat, and a blue cape clipped with a blue circle. She is the most aggressive of the fairies and is bolder and feistier than the other two. As Merryweather is about to give Aurora the gift of happiness, Maleficent makes her appearance and curses the princess to die when she pricks her finger on a spinning wheel's spindle before sunset on her sixteenth birthday. Merryweather softens the curse so that instead of dying, Aurora will fall into a deep sleep until she is awakened by true love's kiss. She is voiced by Barbara Luddy.

Appearances

Sleeping Beauty
The three good fairies arrive at the christening of King Stefan and Queen Leah's newborn daughter, Princess Aurora. They tell King Stefan and Queen Leah that each of them will give a single gift to the infant, and proceed to give their respective gifts, the first two being beauty from Flora and song from Fauna. As Merryweather is about to give her gift, the wicked witch named Maleficent arrives and stresses about not receiving an invitation, to which Merryweather replies that she is "not wanted." Maleficent prepares to leave, but also decides to give a "gift" to Aurora by cursing her so that before the sun sets on her sixteenth birthday, she will prick her finger on a spinning wheel's spindle and die. Merryweather then uses her gift to weaken the curse so that instead of dying, Aurora will only sleep until she awakens to true love's kiss.

The three good fairies plot against Maleficent, since they were not convinced that King Stefan and Queen Leah's response to the curse (declaring that every spinning wheel in the kingdom be burned) would be enough to stop the witch. Flora came up with the plan of the three of them raising Aurora while disguising as peasant women, as the unkind Maleficent would never expect such a thing. All of them are gleeful about it, and they become excited about taking care of a baby. Flora then confiscates Merryweather's and Fauna's wands, since they should avoid using magic while carrying out the plan. After asking for the king and queen's consent, they take Aurora to raise her.

Years later, on the day of Aurora (whom they call Briar Rose)'s sixteenth birthday, the fairies plan a surprise for her, and so they send her berry-picking in the forest (while warning her not to go too far and not to speak to strangers). Merryweather starts to get their wands, arguing that the sixteen years are almost over, but Flora and Fauna object. Flora decides to make the gown (using Merryweather as the dummy) and Fauna says that she'll make the cake. Merryweather tells Flora "But you can't sew," and that Fauna has no experience in cooking, and that they should switch their duties with each other; Flora objects, saying that it is Fauna's last chance to bake. As they work, the three begin to reminisce about the days when Aurora is just a child, and they begin to weep; eventually Flora tells them to finish their tasks. When they finish, Flora is unable to make a proper gown and Fauna is unable to make a stiff cake, angering Merryweather and prompting her to get the wands, and Fauna tells Flora, "You know? I think she's right." After getting the wands, the three fairies block every opening in the house, so that the lights from their magic would not be seen outside, then proceed to do their tasks. As Flora finishes the pink dress, Merryweather, who wants it to be blue, changes its color to blue, irritating Flora who changes it back to pink. Merryweather changes it to blue again, and Flora changes it to pink; this continued, escalated and became a magical quarrel over whether the dress should be pink or blue. The lights from their magical fight begin to escape through the chimney, catching the attention of Maleficent's crow and thus revealing their location. The quarrel ends with the dress getting both of the pink and blue colors, and then the three hear Aurora get near the cottage, prompting Flora and Merryweather to stop their argument and the three prepare their surprise (as they do so, Flora secretly turns the dress' color into pink, then Merryweather secretly turns it into blue). They welcome and surprise Aurora, who tells them that she met a man in the woods whom she loved, and they reveal her true heritage as a princess and that she has been betrothed to Prince Phillip since her christening, and that she must never meet Philip again; this causes Aurora to go to her room and weep in sadness and depression.

Later, they take Aurora to a room in the castle. They conjure a crown for her to wear as a princess, then they leave the depressed girl alone so she could recover more easily. They argue over whether Aurora should be forced to marry Prince Phillip until Flora hears Maleficent's magic, causing them to enter the room and discover that Maleficent has arrived and has hypnotized Aurora into going through a hidden passage which leads up to another room, where Maleficent has turned herself into a spinning wheel. The three fairies pursue Aurora and yell, "Don't touch anything!", but Maleficent lures Aurora to prick her finger on the spindle. The fairies enter the room, but arrive too late as they bump into Maleficent, who taunts the three fairies, then she throws her cloak back to reveal the now-sleeping Aurora. Maleficent then laughs and vanishes as the three fairies weep over Aurora's fate.

The fairies place the sleeping Aurora on a bed in the topmost tower. They weep in sadness, and Flora decides that, in order to prevent everyone from being heartbroken, they put the entire kingdom to sleep until Princess Aurora awakens. While falling asleep, King Hubert tries to tell Stefan of his son being in love with a peasant girl, which makes Flora realize that Prince Phillip is the man Aurora has fallen in love with, and they fly back to the cottage for him. However, Phillip is already captured by Maleficent's goons by that time, so with no other choice, the fairies sneak into Maleficent's stronghold and manage to free the prince. Flora conjures the Sword of Truth and the Shield of Virtue for Phillip to wield, and they escape from the Forbidden Mountain whilst being attacked by Maleficent's minions, whose attacks are countered by the three good fairies. When Diablo tries to warn Maleficent, Merryweather chases him and eventually turns him into a stone statue. The fairies then assist Phillip in his escape, and battle against Maleficent, ultimately enhancing Phillip's sword as he throws it directly into Maleficent's heart, thus destroying Maleficent. The fairies then lead Phillip to the tower room where Aurora sleeps and there, he wakes her with true love's kiss, then the whole kingdom wakes with her. The fairies watch Aurora reunite with her parents and as she dances with Phillip, but Flora and Merryweather's argument over the color of Aurora's gown is revived.

Maleficent
The good fairies also appear in Disney's live-action film Maleficent, as a trio of pixies named Knotgrass, Flittle, and Thistlewit, respectively. The pixies are markedly different from their animated counterparts, with their role being reduced to comic relief; they are shown to be incompetent and unable to fulfill their task of raising Aurora as mortals. The child's actual care is overseen by Maleficent in secret.
Knotgrass (Imelda Staunton) wears shades of red and is the Flora equivalent: bossy and superior. She blesses Aurora with the gift of beauty.
Flittle (Lesley Manville) wears blue (like Merryweather) but is the Fauna equivalent: naive and absent-minded. She blesses Aurora with the gift of happiness. In the sequel, Maleficent: Mistress of Evil, she sacrifices herself in an effort to save the Moorland fair folk from Queen Ingrith's genocide plot.
Thistlewit (Juno Temple) wears green and yellow (the subtractive counterpart of green, which is the color of Fauna's dress) but is the Merryweather equivalent: giddy, playful and childlike. She was interrupted by Maleficent before she could bless Aurora. By Aurora's sixteenth birthday, she and Knotgrass bicker about when to take Aurora back to King Stefan, and in Maleficent: Mistress of Evil, they bicker about the color of Aurora's wedding gown.

Other appearances
The three good fairies also appear in Disney Princess Enchanted Tales: Follow Your Dreams during the "Keys to the Kingdom" segment. As King Stefan, Queen Leah, King Hubert and Prince Phillip leave the kingdom for a Royal Conference; Aurora is left in charge of the kingdom, with the castle majordomo, Lord Duke, as her assistant. The fairies offer to help her, but Aurora declines; however, Aurora later asks the three good fairies to deliver King Hubert his speech which he has forgotten at the castle. Before leaving with Flora and Fauna, Merryweather still is worried about Aurora and she gives her wand to the princess in case she needs any assistance and warns her to be very careful with it. The fairies manage to deliver the speech in time, and are about to return when Merryweather reveals she had lent her wand to Aurora when she was not supposed to do so. The fairies appear at the end of the segment and take part of the welcome-back meal by Aurora, along with Prince Phillip, King Stefan, Queen Leah, King Hubert, and Lord Duke. They were also among the Disney characters to appear at the end of The Lion King 1½. They are in the last shown crowd before Timon and Pumbaa start the movie again sitting between Terk (from Tarzan) and Br'er Bear (from Song of the South).

The three good fairies also play a role in the Kingdom Hearts series of video games. They first appear in Kingdom Hearts II at Yen Sid's tower, giving Sora his new outfit after he wakes from his year-long sleep, as well as the Star Seeker Keyblade and the ability to use Drive, and later witnessing Maleficent's return to power. At first, they all argue over what color Sora's new outfit should be, until agreeing to zap it all at the same time. The end result is a black outfit with colorful highlights all over. In Kingdom Hearts Birth by Sleep, the fairies appear in their homeworld, the "Enchanted Dominion", talking with Ventus about Aurora and Phillip and later assisting him in his battle against Maleficent. They also appear at the end of Aqua and Phillip's battle against Maleficent in her dragon form, again blessing Phillip's sword as he throws it into Maleficent's heart; however, the attack does not kill her and just defeats her. During the credits, while Aurora and Phillip are dancing, Flora and Merryweather continue their old argument over what color Aurora's dress should be. They do not make a physical appearance in Kingdom Hearts III, but are mentioned by Yen Sid as the creators of the cast's new clothes.

The three fairies had appeared as guests in the TV series House of Mouse. They also appear at themed-parks and live events. They co-host the Magic, Music and Mayhem show with the Fairy Godmother from Cinderella. In the Disney Divas event at Disneyland, the fairies appeared at the climax of the show, confronting Maleficent, the Evil Queen and Cruella de Vil, among others, and later introducing Cynthia Harriss, former president of Disneyland Resort. As of 2013, Flora, Fauna and Merryweather appear as regular characters in Disney's Sofia the First animated television series. The three fairies are also playable characters in the video game Disney Magic Kingdoms.

Reception
The characters received positive reception. Variety stated that "Some of the best parts of the picture are those dealing with the three good fairies," Rob Burch, of Hollywood News, noted how the fairies are more prominent than the film's title character Aurora: "It could be argued the three Fairies are the real heroines, as much of the running time revolves around them." Of the three, he praised Merryweather as the best character. Bosley Crowther of The New York Times stated "Indeed, these busy little ladies, fluffy grandmotherly types, called Flora, Fauna and Merryweather, whose operations are conducted largely with wands." He further notes: "They [the fairies] are cunning, especially when they've 'wanded' themselves down to glowworm size and go buzzing through the palace or across the country as cheerful little lights."

References

External links

 

Film characters introduced in 1959
Sleeping Beauty (1959 film) characters
Animated characters introduced in 1959
Female characters in animation
Female characters in film
Fictional fairies and sprites
Fictional trios